The Finniss Ministry was the 1st Ministry of the Government of South Australia, led by B. T. Finniss. It commenced on 24 October 1856 with the introduction of responsible government in South Australia, and the nomination by Governor Richard Graves MacDonnell of Finniss, the appointed Chief Secretary, as the first Premier of South Australia. The ministry operated for several months prior to the 1857 colonial election, which would elect the first House of Assembly. The first House of Assembly was elected in March 1857 and met in April. The Finniss Ministry was succeeded by the Baker Ministry on 21 August 1857, following their defeat on a confidence motion in the new House.

Composition of ministry

References

South Australian ministries
1856 establishments in Australia